Babiana angustifolia is a plant species in the family Iridaceae.

References

angustifolia
Endemic flora of South Africa
Flora of the Cape Provinces
Renosterveld